Centronia peruviana is a species of plant in the family Melastomataceae. It is endemic to Peru.

Description 
The plant has been observed growing from 3-5 m in height. It bears flowers with waxy pinkish petals.

References

Endemic flora of Peru
peruviana
Vulnerable plants
Taxonomy articles created by Polbot
Taxa named by James Francis Macbride
Plants described in 1941